= Avsarlu =

- Location within Armenia
- Coordinates: 39°07′59″N 46°15′36″E
- Country: Armenia
- Marz (Province): Syunik
- Time zone: UTC+4 ( )
  - Summer (DST): UTC+5 ( )

Avsarlu (also, Arrjahur, Arjagur, Arjagur-Avsarlu, and Razvaliny Avsarlu) is a town in the Syunik Province of Armenia.
